Jiangtai Lu Station is a metro station on Line 2 of the Guangzhou Metro. The underground station is located at the junction of Jiangnan Avenue and Jiangtai Road in the Haizhu District of Guangzhou.

Neighboring Buildings  
 Jiangnan Dadao South Public Transport Interchange
 Xiaoyuan Secondary School

Railway stations in China opened in 2010
Guangzhou Metro stations in Haizhu District